There are a small number of heritage railways in the Republic of Ireland, reflecting Ireland's long history of rail transport.  Some former operations have closed, and aspirant operations may have museums and even rolling stock, but no operating track. There are also working groups, which may run heritage rolling stock on main lines.

Heritage railways

Operating
Some of the main preserved or restored railways include:
 Cavan and Leitrim Railway, County Leitrim
 Fintown Railway, based in Fintown, County Donegal, which runs along the length of Lough Finn to Glenties Line for about a mile
 Listowel and Ballybunion Railway, a section of the Lartigue Monorail system, has been restored for visitors in Listowel, County Kerry
 Stradbally Woodland Railway, County Laois
It operates alongside the Waterford Greenway and is Ireland's longest heritage line.
 West Clare Railway, County Clare

Prospective
 Connemara Railway, based at Maam Cross, County Galway, operating a temporary narrow gauge railway
 The Donegal Railway Heritage Centre in County Donegal, commemorating the operations of the County Donegal Railways Joint Committee which once had two narrow gauge railway systems
 Sligo, Leitrim and Northern Counties Railway, the last surviving independently operated railway in the Republic of Ireland (1879-1959)

Defunct
 Clonmacnoise and West Offaly Railway in County Offaly, run by Bord na Móna, near Shannonbridge, closed 2008
 Tralee and Dingle Light Railway, between Tralee and Dingle, which operated 1993-2013

Preservation groups
Preservation groups in the Republic of Ireland include:
 The Irish Steam Preservation Society, based in Stradbally, County Laois, which operates the Stradbally Woodland Railway with vintage steam and diesel locomotives.
 The Irish Traction Group, based in Carrick-on-Suir, County Tipperary, which has a diesel locomotive collection at the site by the Limerick–Waterford railway route. ITG also run regular railtours around the country, sometimes with older (but still in regular use) Iarnród Éireann locomotives and rolling stock.
 The Railway Preservation Society of Ireland, an all-island body, with bases in County Antrim and Dublin, and a museum in the former; holds a full operating licence and operates heritage-themed excursions on the main lines in both jurisdictions.

See also

 Conservation in the Republic of Ireland
 List of heritage railways
 List of heritage railways in Northern Ireland
 List of narrow gauge railways in Ireland

References

Ireland, Republic of

Republic of Ireland transport-related lists
Irish railway-related lists
Lists of buildings and structures in the Republic of Ireland
Cultural heritage of Ireland